Sahyadri Polytechnic is a polytechnic in Thirthahalli, Karnataka, India. It is approved by the All India Council for Technical Education.

History

The polytechnic was established in 1985 by M.R. Dharmaiah Gowda under the chairmanship of D.B. Chandre Gowda. Aroor Ramesh Rao became the administrator in 1996. The campus is on the Sagar-Thirthahalli road, a hilly area with much greenery.

The institution provides computer-based learning programs to meet the needs of industry and business. It has staff members who provide training in supportive, physical and learning environment.

Branches

 Mechanical Engineering (government-aided)
 Civil Engineering (government-aided)
 Electricals & Electronics Engineering (government-aided)
 Computer Science and Engineering
 Electronic and Communication Engineering

Syllabus and examination scheme

The syllabus was set by the Karnataka Board of Technical Education. The semester examinations are conducted by Karnataka Technical Examination Board every November and April; they evaluate and announce the results.

Admission
Government-aided course admission is done through a centralized counseling process. Admission for courses with no government aid is conducted directly through the college.

Sports and cultural activities
The polytechnic organizes cricket matches between its branches every year for the remembrance of its founder, with all the branches participating in the MRD cup.

It organizes a technical program called "Techno-poly". It also organizes essay writing, debates, skits and many competitions during national festivals and many other occasions.

Placements
Many companies come to this campus for interviews. Graduates are working in reputed companies like Microsoft, HP, Mindtree, TESCO, CTS, Mahindra Satyam, Jindal-steels, L&T-Komatsu, AMS, Maruthi, WIPRO etc.

Alumni association

Sahyadri Polytechnic celebrated its 25-year anniversary in January 2011, with a program named "Sahayadri Sammilana". Past and present students participated, and the event marked the formation of the Sahyadri Polytechnic alumni association.

References

External links

 
 Board of Technical Education, Karnataka
 Facebook page of Sahyadri Polytechnic
 SPT Alumni Association

Engineering colleges in Karnataka
Educational institutions established in 1985
Universities and colleges in Shimoga district
1985 establishments in Karnataka